North Penn Mosque is a mosque in Lansdale, Montgomery County, Pennsylvania. In addition to daily prayers, the mosque arranges education programs, social activities, interfaith dialogues, and peace efforts in the community.

History
North Penn Mosque was established in 2000 when local Muslims realized they needed a place to congregate and pray together. The site of the mosque sits on the former Saint Marie Club.

After a zoning hearing on February 18, 2014, the mosque received permission to convert a nearby building they had bought into an education center. It was intended for after-school religious educational classes, as well as private apartments for religious instructors capable of housing two families, and money was raised with fundraisers.

On April 4, 2021, 650 people were vaccinated at the mosque which was used as a COVID-19 vaccination clinic.

See also
List of mosques in the United States

References

External links

2000 establishments in Pennsylvania
Mosques in Pennsylvania
Religious buildings and structures in Montgomery County, Maryland
Islamic organizations established in 2000
Mosques completed in 2000